Chris Matheson may refer to:

 Chris Matheson (screenwriter) (born 1960), American film director and screenwriter
 Chris Matheson (politician) (born 1968), British Member of Parliament
 Chris Matheson, Mayor of Gainesville, Florida from 1910–1917